Ornativalva sinica is a moth of the family Gelechiidae. It was described by Hou-Hun Li in 1991. It is found in China.

References

Moths described in 1991
Ornativalva